Union Sportive de Remchi, known as US Remchi or USR for short, is an Algerian football club located in Remchi, Algeria. The club was founded in 1928 and its colours are red and white. Their home stadium, Stade 18 Février de Remchi, has a capacity of 2,000 spectators. The club is currently playing in the Algerian Ligue 2.

On August 5, 2020, US Remchi promoted to the Algerian Ligue 2.

References

Football clubs in Algeria
Association football clubs established in 1928
1928 establishments in Algeria
Sports clubs in Algeria